Pedro Tafur (or Pero Tafur) (c. 1410 – c. 1484) was a traveller, historian and writer from Castile (modern day Spain). Born in Córdoba, to a branch of the noble house of Guzmán, Tafur traveled across three continents during the years 1436 to 1439.  During the voyage, he participated in various battles, visited shrines, and rendered diplomatic services for Juan II of Castile. He visited the Moroccan coast, southern France, the Holy Land, Egypt, Rhodes, Cyprus,  Tenedos, Trebizond, Caffa, and Constantinople.  He also visited the Sinai Peninsula, where he met Niccolò Da Conti, who shared with Tafur information about southeastern Asia.  Before returning to Spain, Tafur crossed central Europe and Italy.

Between 1453 and 1454, to judge from interior evidence in the single surviving manuscript, he wrote a book called Andanças e viajes de Pero Tafur por diversas partes del mundo avidos (Avid Adventures and Travels of Pero Tafur to Various Parts of the World). But it didn't appear in print until 1874, when it was published by Marcos Jiménez de la Espada. This work is one of the few books written by a Spanish traveler during the medieval period (that of Ruy González de Clavijo is another example). Tafur dedicates his book to a member of the Guzmán family, the same family to which Saint Dominic belonged. He thus provides biographical information regarding this saint. He also provides valuable details concerning the Baths of Zeuxippus, the Hagia Sophia, the Holy doors in Rome, and the obelisks in Rome.

Having returned to Spain in 1439, some time before 1452 Tafur married Doña Juana de Horozco. A son appears to have predeceased his father, but three daughters are mentioned in Doña Juana's will. He played a prominent role in local affairs: he and his son both held office as aldermen in 1479.

See also 

 Juan Tafur
 Martín Yañéz Tafur

Notes

Further reading 
 Kilinç, Hakan, Pero Tafur Seyahatnamesi, Kitap Yayınevi, İstanbul 2016.
 Tafur, Pero: Travels and Adventures 1435-1439, Routledge, 2004.
 López Estrada, Francisco:  Libros de viajeros hispánicos medievales Madrid, Ediciones Laberinto, 2002. .
 Ramírez de Arellano, Rafael: Estudios biográficos: Pero Tafur. Boletín de la Real Academia de la Historia.41: 278-98.
 Vives Gatell, José: Andanças e viajes de un higaldo español (Pero Tafur, 1436-1439),con una descripción de Roma. Analecta Sacra Tarraconensia 19 (1949): 127-207.
 Cartellieri, Otto: Pero Tafur, ein spanischer Weltreisender des 15. Jahrhunderts, in: Festschrift Alexander Cartellieri zu seinem sechzigsten Geburtstag dargebracht von Freunden und Schülern, Weimar 1927.
 Stehlin, Karl & Thommen, Rudolf: Aus der Reisebeschreibung des Pero Tafur, 1438 und 1439.
 Martínez García, Pedro:  El cara a cara con el otro: la visión de lo ajeno a fines de la Edad Media y comienzos de la Edad Moderna a través del viaje , Frankfurt am Main, Peter Lang 2015.

External links 
 
  Online text of Tafur’s travels
  The Travels of Pero Tafur (1435-1439) and Pero Tafur: Travels and Adventures 1435-1439
  Viaje de Pedro Tafur por el imperio germánico en los años 1438 y 1439. Las hermandades de Castilla en tiempo de Enrique IV (a review), Bienvenido Oliver y Esteller. Edición digital a partir de Boletín de la Real Academia de la Historia, tomo 14 (mayo 1889), pp. 379-389. Centro Virtual Cervantes
  Las memorias de Pedro Tafur, Franco Meregalli
   Espacios sagrados y espacios míticos La retórica del viaje en las Andanças de Pero Tafur, María José Rodilla 

1410 births
1484 deaths
15th-century Castilians
15th-century Spanish writers
Spanish explorers
15th-century travel writers
Spanish travel writers
People from Córdoba, Spain